The Chicks Tour / 2023 World Tour is the sixth headlining concert tour from American country music trio The Chicks and their first under their new name. It began on June 14, 2022, in Maryland Heights, Missouri and initially concluded in Austin, Texas. Following this, the group are set to play their first ever Las Vegas residency, The Chicks: Six Nights in Vegas in May 2023, at the Zappos Theater. The second leg of the tour is scheduled to begin on June 20, 2023, in Oslo, Norway and will finish on September 18, 2023, in Toronto, Canada.

Background 
The first leg of the tour was announced on February 28, 2022. In February 2023, The Chicks announced the second leg of the tour, rebranded as The Chicks World Tour 2023.

Show synopsis
The show begins with music from female bands playing across the venue, then The Chicks emerge from the back of the stage. They start off with their 1999 single, "Sin Wagon". The graphics on the video boards are used throughout the show. They depict from featuring the five Supreme Court judges who voted to overturn Roe v. Wade, protests, marches, etc. They play mostly their past hits along with a few from their 2020 album Gaslighter. The show ends with "Goodbye Earl".

Natalie Maines' son, Slade and Martie Maguire's daughter, Eva are members of their backing band.

Critical reception
Sorena Dadgar of CLTure attended the Raleigh show and said, "The Chicks's return to the limelight felt seamless; songs from the group's latest album drew just as much of a response as their most popular albums Fly and Wide Open Spaces from the late '90s." SFGATE Gabe Lehman who attend the Mountain View show praised lead singer Natalie Maines' (who had been a brief vocal rest) vocals. He said, "Maines is like a veteran pitcher who can no longer throw 100 mph for an entire game but still can bring the heat for a high-leverage strikeout."

Opening acts
Patty Griffin 
Jenny Lewis 
Maren Morris 
Ben Harper 
Wild Rivers

Setlist
This set list is representative of the show on June 14, 2022, at Hollywood Casino Amphitheatre in Maryland Heights, Missouri. It is not representative of all concerts for the duration of the tour.
"Sin Wagon"
"Gaslighter"
"Texas Man"
"Julianna Calm Down"
"The Long Way Around"
"Hope It's Something Good"
"Sleep at Night"
"Truth #2"
"Wide Open Spaces"
"Tights on My Boat"
"Lubbock or Leave It"
"Long Time Gone" 
"Cowboy Take Me Away"
"Landslide 
"Don't Let Me Die in Florida" 
"March March"
"For Her"
"White Trash Wedding"
"Everybody Loves You"
"Young Man"
"Not Ready to Make Nice "
"Goodbye Earl"

Notes

Tour dates

Reschedules dates
The Chicks had to postpone three shows when lead singer Natalie Maines was placed on vocal rest by doctors following her stopping their show in Noblesville after half an hour.
The June 22, 2022, show in Clarkston was rescheduled to September 28.
The June 19, 2022, show in Noblesville was rescheduled to September 30.
The June 21, 2022, show in Cincinnati was rescheduled to October 2.

References

2022 concert tours
2023 concert tours
The Chicks concert tours